Bruce Hunter may refer to:

 Bruce Hunter (poet) (born 1952), Canadian poet, novelist and teacher
 Bruce Hunter (politician) (born 1955), Iowa State Representative
 Bruce Hunter (actor) (born 1961), Canadian actor and comedian
 Bruce Hunter (swimmer) (1939–2018), American swimmer
 Bruce Hunter (rugby union) (born 1950), New Zealand rugby union player